Kembainaickenpalayam is a panchayat town in Erode district in the Indian state of Tamil Nadu.

Demographics
 India census, Kembainaickenpalayam had a population of 10,305. Males constitute 51% of the population and females 49%. Kembainaickenpalayam has an average literacy rate of 46%, lower than the national average of 59.5%: male literacy is 55%, and female literacy is 36%. In Kembainaickenpalayam, 9% of the population is under 6 years of age.

References

Cities and towns in Erode district